Alkarama ( / ISO 233:  / Dignity) is an independent Swiss-based human rights non-governmental organization established in 2004 to assist all those in the Arab World subjected to, or at risk of, extrajudicial killings, disappearances, torture, and arbitrary detention. 
Acting as a bridge between individual victims in the Arab World and international human rights mechanisms, Alkarama works towards an Arab World where all individuals live free, with dignity, and protected by the rule of law.

Organization

Mission
Alkarama is an NGO defending the victims of human rights violations in the Arab world – including violations of the right to life, to physical and mental integrity, and to Civil and Political Rights – by using in priority international law mechanisms. Alkarama also helps to promote a culture of human rights in the Arab world.

Although it recognises the indivisibility of human rights, Alkarama has given priority to the defence of people subjected or at risk of extrajudicial killing, enforced disappearance, torture, and arbitrary detention, as Alkarama regards these violations of the right to life, physical integrity, and civil and political rights as common in this region.

To end these violations, Alkarama cooperates with local and national civil society activists and international organisations for the promotion and protection of human rights, as well as governments and other entities likely to act on the human rights situation.

By engaging international mechanisms, Alkarama offers support and a last resort to the victims of these human rights violations, so that they achieve respect for their rights against the failure or inefficiency of their country's justice system.

Alkarama also works for a strong international system of human rights protection, which reinforces the regional, national, and local protection systems. In, particular, it contributes to fill the information gaps, and to increase the attention of international human rights protection mechanisms on human rights violations taking place in the Arab World. Alkarama encourages States to strengthen their national laws to defend and promote human rights.

Finally, Alkarama contributes to the promotion of the culture of human rights, by ensuring that the various groups that make up the civil society in these countries are familiar with the concept of human rights and are mobilising around it, know their rights and claim them, and feel protected by law.

Through its projects, Alkarama provides these actors the necessary tools so that they can assert their rights both nationally and internationally.

Goals
1. Document and denounce human rights violations in the Arab world

2. Provide moral and judicial assistance to the victims of human rights violations

3. Pursue the perpetrators of human rights violations and fight impunity

4. Encourage, and campaign for governments to respect human rights

5. Spread the culture of human rights in Arab societies

6. Train human rights defenders

7. Support any initiative which reinforces the protection of citizens against human rights violations

8. Be an effective organization

Focus

Alkarama focuses on the most serious human rights violations, i.e. violations that relate to the right to life, human dignity, bodily integrity and freedom. The idea behind Alkarama's specific mandate is that only when citizens are free from the most serious human rights abuses that individuals can freely and effectively call for all of their rights and ensure the rule of law in their countries.

(i) Extrajudicial Killings

According to the International Covenant on Civil and Political Rights (ICCPR):

Every human being has the inherent right to life. This right shall be protected by law. No one shall be arbitrarily deprived of his life.

The United Nations Special Rapporteur on Extrajudicial, Summary or Arbitrary Executions intervenes on cases of executions outside the legal framework or without the proper legal safeguards: capital punishment following an unfair trial, deaths in custody, deaths due to excessive use of force by law enforcement officials, deaths due to attacks by States security forces, violations of the right to life in armed conflict, genocide, and the imminent expulsion of persons to a country where their lives are in danger.

(ii) Enforced Disappearance

According to the International Convention for the Protection of All Persons from Enforced Disappearance (CED):

Enforced disappearance is considered to be the arrest, detention, abduction or any other form of deprivation of liberty by agents of the State or by persons or groups of persons acting with the authorisation, support or acquiescence of the State, followed by a refusal to acknowledge the deprivation of liberty or by concealment of the fate or whereabouts of the disappeared person, which place such a person outside the protection of the law.

A tool of repression

Many of the governments of the Arab World use disappearances to silence opposition members and terrorize the population.

Algeria is a notable example of this practice. Alkarama has presented over 1,000 cases of disappearances to the United Nations Working Group on Enforced or Involuntary Disappearances (WGEID). The number of disappeared in Algeria is estimated at between 10,000 and 20,000 – the Algerian government admitted to 6,164 in 2005; the Algerian national human rights institution, the Commission Nationale Consultative de Promotion et de Protection des Droits de l'Homme (CNCPPDH) to 8,023.

(iii) Torture

According to the Convention against Torture (CAT):

Torture means any act by which severe pain or suffering, whether physical or mental, is intentionally inflicted on a person for such purposes as obtaining from him or a third person information or a confession, punishing him for an act he or a third person has committed or is suspected of having committed, or intimidating or coercing him or a third person, or for any reason based on discrimination of any kind, when such pain or suffering is inflicted by or at the instigation of or with the consent or acquiescence of a public official or other person acting in an official capacity. It does not include pain or suffering arising only from, inherent in or incidental to lawful sanctions.

Upon receipt of information about cases of torture from its representatives and civil society contacts in the Arab world, Alkarama writes a communication to the United Nations Special Rapporteur on Torture (SRT) with details of the case.

(iv) Arbitrary Detention

According to the UN Working Group on Arbitrary Detention (WGAD):

Deprivation of liberty is arbitrary if the case falls into one of the following three categories:

1. When it is clearly impossible to invoke any legal basis justifying the deprivation of liberty [...] (Category I)

2. When the deprivation of liberty results from the exercise of the rights and freedoms guaranteed by the Universal Declaration of Human Rights and, insofar as States parties are concerned, by the International Covenant on Civil and Political Rights (Category II)

3. When the total or partial non-observance of the international norms relating to the right to a fair trial spelled out in the Universal Declaration of Human Rights and in the relevant international instruments accepted by the States concerned, is of such gravity as to give the deprivation of liberty an arbitrary character (Category III). (WGAD, Fact Sheet No. 26)

Arbitrary Detention in the Arab World: the United Nations' Opinion

Arab governments often arrest and detain political opponents and human rights defenders in order to quiet their criticism of government policies and behaviour. The opinions issued by the WGAD can then be used in local and international advocacy against these detentions, be brought up with the governments and authorities directly, and can lead to enough pressure to have these individuals released in some cases. Many governments are very sensitive to their international image and human rights record.

History

2004: Creation of Alkarama 

Alkarama was created as a Swiss association in July 2004 by Qatari and Algerian human rights defenders – Abdulrahman Al Naimi, Rachid Mesli and Abbas Aroua – to contribute to an Arab World where all individuals live free, in dignity, and protected by the rule of law. With this goal in mind, the founders decided to address the most serious violations of human dignity, physical integrity and freedom, namely extrajudicial killings, enforced disappearances, torture, and arbitrary detention, with the hope that individuals who no longer fear being subjected to these violations can speak and act freely to call for their rights and ensure the rule of law in their countries.

At the time of Alkarama's creation, the United Nations (UN) mechanisms established to protect human rights worldwide rarely acted upon violations in the Arab region. Identifying this gap, Alkarama decided that in order to bring these violations to an end, Alkarama would act through the UN's mechanisms specific to bring these human rights violations to an end. In doing so, Alkarama would also fulfill its objective to contribute to a better understanding of human rights and raise awareness of the UN's human rights protection mechanisms in the Arab civil society, including amongst social groups who often viewed these instruments as ineffective or understood rights as Western concepts, in particular Islamist groups, political opposition parties, and journalists.

By acting as a bridge between the victims in the Arab world and the UN Special Procedures experts, whilst building the capacity of local activists to directly access UN mechanisms and use the decisions, they adopt to call for the respect of human rights in their countries, Alkarama gave itself the means to achieve its two main objectives simultaneously. This involves speaking directly and regularly with victims and their families, lawyers, or local activists to document individual cases of human rights violations; and submitting these cases to the UN mechanisms for them to request the relevant government authorities to remedy to the situation.

Between 2004 and 2007, Rachid Mesli, at the time Alkarama's sole employee in Geneva, submitted around 400 individual cases to the UN Special Procedures. That led to these mechanisms' action with a number of Arab States, and a noticeable improvement of the situation for many of the victims. Following up on its successes and growing needs, in 2005 Alkarama recruited Country Representatives in Lebanon and Yemen in order to follow the human rights situation in these countries and document further cases of violations to submit to the UN. Alkarama's website was launched the same year.

2007: Alkarama Foundation 

In April 2007, in the face of an ever-increasing workload and in order to undertake the necessary changes in capital and human resources, Alkarama registers as a Foundation under Swiss law. This change in status aimed to ensure greater stability and transparency, by enabling the Swiss authorities to review the organisation's financial records on a yearly basis.

2007: Working with UN Treaty Bodies 

As of 2007, Alkarama began working with the UN Human Rights Treaty Bodies – in particular the Committee Against Torture (CAT), the Human Rights Committee (HRCttee) and the Universal Periodic Review (UPR) instituted by the newly established Human Rights Council (HRC) – by submitting alternative information regarding the Arab State's implementation of the relevant treaties at every stage of their review process. In doing so, Alkarama provides the CAT and HRCttee expert, as well as members of the (HRC) access to information from civil society actors as well as concrete cases of violations of numerous articles of the Universal Declaration of Human Rights, the Convention Against Torture and the International Covenant on Civil and Political Rights (ICCPR).

2009: Working to strengthen national human rights institutions 

In 2009, facing the increasingly negative roles played by National Human Rights Institutions (NHRIs), Alkarama begins providing independent information from local civil society actors about these institutions to the International Coordinating Committee on (ICC-NHRIs), which regularly reviews the status of these institutions, resulting in a number of reforms within these institutions.

2009: Launch of the Alkarama Award for Human Rights Defenders 

Also in 2009, Alkarama launched the Alkarama Award for Human Rights Defenders, a symbolic reward attributed every year to an individual or organisation that has significantly contributed to the promotion and protection of human rights in the Arab world (to read more about the Award and the previous laureates, click here). Through this award, Alkarama was able to fulfill two objectives: to bring attention to the work of human rights defenders (HRDs) in the Arab world, whilst providing the UN, non-governmental organisations (NGOs), the media, and the general public an opportunity to learn about the individual heroes struggling for the promotion and protection of human rights in the Arab region.

2011 (During the "Arab Spring" and after): Acting as a major relay of information 

As the events of 2011 began to unfold in the Arab World, Alkarama stood alongside those calling for the respect of their rights and became a major relay of information for the UN mechanisms and the media, on the uprisings in Egypt, Libya, Yemen and then Syria. With Country Representatives in Egypt, Lebanon and Yemen, as well as several visits to Libya, Alkarama was able to closely monitor the violations occurring, reporting them in real time whilst raising awareness amongst the new groups rising to power of their obligation to respect human rights.

Alkarama Today

Alkarama today is made up of nine full-time employees in Geneva, and five representatives in the Arab World. It also trains about 10 interns per year in its Legal or Media Departments.

Although founded in 2004 as a society, since 2007 Alkarama has been a registered Swiss Foundation.

Alkarama is a trilingual organisation, publishing material in Arabic, English and French.

Alleged link to terrorist groups
As an NGO working on a daily basis with the United Nations human rights protection mechanisms by submitting to these UN bodies detailed information on serious human rights violations committed by States in the region, Alkarama has often been the victim of defamation campaigns, whilst several members of its staff have been targeted  – in their own capacity and not necessarily because of their relation with Alkarama – such as executive director, Mourad Dhina and legal director, Rachid Mesli, both victims of international arrest warrants issued by the Algerian government; as well as founding member and former chairman of the Foundation's Council, Abdulrahman Al Naimi, listed by the U.S. Treasury as an “Al Qaeda financier” although the charges were never substantiated.

Among others, on 2 September 2014, the Lebanese newspaper, As-Safir published an article entitled The Founder of the Cham Al Islam movement, a prominent activist within Alkarama, which openly accuses Alkarama of "supporting terrorism" and "spreading anarchy". In the following couple of days, these allegations were echoed in the Hezbollah-affiliated Lebanese information channel, Al Manar, in Syrian governmental news sites, RTV.gov and Al Tawra, as well as in Saudi-run news site on Syria, Al Akhbar Al Youm. On 3 September, Commentary, a magazine founded by the American Jewish Committee in 1945, accused Alkarama of being run by an "Al Qaeda financier", in reference to Alkarama's Founder, Mr Abdulrahman Al Naimi.

On 14 October 2014, the Swiss newspaper, Le Temps published an article entitled The town of Geneva funded an NGO accused of links with Al Qaeda, which was relayed by other Swiss media outlets. The article relied exclusively on the unproven listing of one of Alkarama's three founding members as an “Al Qaeda financier” (see below). A month later, Le Temps published a feature by Alkarama's Legal Director, Rachid Mesli, speaking of the difficulty to defend human rights in the Arab World, explaining that in the Arab World, those who dare criticise authoritarian regimes or demand more freedom are accused of terrorism to stifle any criticism or demand to take part in the country's political life. “It is therefore not surprising that Alkarama, which defends victims of this repression, finds itself vilified and attacked by these regimes; that international NGOs such as the Council on American-Islamic Relations and Islamic Relief find themselves on the UAE’s list of terrorist organisations along with ISIL and Al Qaeda; and that the former Chairman of our Foundation, Dr Abdulrahman Al Naimi, a university Professor, a Qatari human rights activist and a former Amnesty prisoner of conscience be banned from several countries – including the UAE and Saudi Arabia,” explained Me Mesli.

The current president of Alkarama's Board of Trustees, Khalifa al-Rabban, is a Founding Member and Member of the Board of Trustees of the Global Anti-Aggression Campaign (GAAC) alongside Abdulrahman Al Naimi. An online portal for articles on human-rights matters in the Arab World, the GAAC's founding statement, written by Alkarama founding member Abdulrahman Al Naimi, claims that Islam is under siege and that the organisation seeks to confront the Western “aggressor.” GAAC has also hosted Hamas leaders.

Alkarama unambiguously and irrevocably denies all these accusations, but the Foundation can only work in a spirit of full transparency. You can find details of its cases below.

2012: Arrest and detention of Mourad Dhina in Paris 
In 2012, Alkarama's executive director, Dr Mourad Dhina, who had openly called for democratic change in Algeria for years was detained in France for six months on a request from the Algerian authorities to have him extradited to the country. The French court released him when they received documents from the Algerian authorities, which were so incoherent and lacking any evidence that the French prosecutor qualified them as "grotesque". Dr. Dhina returned to Alkarama after having spent almost 6 months at the Prison de la Santé in Paris.

2013: Listing of one of Alkarama's three founding members, Pr. Al Naimi, by the United States Department of the Treasury 
On 18 December 2013, the United States Department of Treasury listed one of Alkarama's three founding members, Pr. Abdulrahman Al Naimi as a “Specially Designated Global Terrorist” for having supposedly “provided money and material support and conveyed communications to Al Qaeda and its affiliates in Syria, Iraq, Somalia and Yemen for more than a decade.”[1]  In addition, the U.S. Treasury claimed that Naimi had “reportedly oversaw the transfer of over $2 million per month to al-Qa’ida in Iraq for a period of time” and “served as an interlocutor between al-Qaida in Iraq leaders and Qatar-based donors.” Speaking to the Financial Times from Istanbul, Al Naimi denied the charges leveled against him.[2]  Al Naimi is also a secretary general of the Global Anti-Aggression Campaign, an online NGO that has hosted Hamas leaders and released anti-Semitic and anti-Western writings. Following the listing, Pr. Al Naimi resigned from the Foundation to avoid any misinterpretation. However, the Alkarama Council decided to reject the resignation of Mr. Al Naimi after initially accepting it. In July 2014, Naimi stepped down as president and Member of the Board of Alkarama.

It is important to note, however, that the charges brought by the U.S. Treasury against him were made against his own person, and not the Foundation. Besides, the U.S. Treasury has not submitted any evidence or proof of its allegations against Pr Al Naimi, who denies all charges as a whole, and is willing, as he officially notified the American authorities, to appear in person before a court to establish the falsity of the charges pressed against him. Al Naimi has, however, received widespread media coverage for his support to terrorist groups.

2014: Listing of Alkarama as a terrorist organisation by the United Arab Emirates 
On 15 November 2014, the Emirates News Agency released a list of 85 organisations “designated as terrorist organisations and groups in implementation of Federal Law No. 7 for 2014 on combating terrorist crimes” issued by Sheikh Khalifa bin Zayed Al Nayhan with the aim to “raise awareness in society about these organisations.”

The list, which includes internationally recognised terrorist organisations, such as Al-Qaeda or Dae’sh (the Islamic State of Iraq and the Levant - ISIL), also includes several Muslim associations in Europe and international NGOs, such as the Council on American-Islamic Relations (CAIR) and Islamic Relief. “Alkarama organisation” also appears in that list, but despite numerous attempts to contact Emirati officials on this matter, the Alkarama Foundation never received an official confirmation and therefore considers itself not concerned by that listing.

2015: Arrest of Rachid Mesli in Italy 
Me Rachid Mesli, Legal Director at Alkarama, was arrested at the Swiss-Italian border on 19 August 2015 on the basis of an international arrest warrant issued by the Algerian authorities in April 2002, which claims that he had "provided telephone information to terrorist groups movements," and "attempted to supply terrorist groups with cameras and phones," twisting his work as a human rights lawyer, in constant contact with victims of human rights abuses and their families.

On 22 August, the Italian justice decided to put him under house arrest instead of keeping him in Aosta prison, following several calls from various NGOs, institutions and personalities, as well as an important media coverage of his case.

On 15 September 2015, recognizing Me Mesli's important work in the promotion and protection of human rights in the Arab World, as well as the strong risks of torture that he would incur if he was extradited to Algeria, the Turin Court decided to release him without waiting for the end of the 40-day period by which the Algerian authorities can submit their formal request for extradition.

Eventually, on 16 December 2015, the Italian court rejected the extradition request after noting all the inconsistencies in the international arrest warrant. The court considered the charges against Me Mesli were the result of "political persecution" and asserted that "his human rights activities have nothing to do with terrorism."

And on 13 May 2016, the Commission for the Control of Interpol's Files decided, after a long legal battle, to drop the international arrest warrant issued in 2003 by the Algerian authorities against Me Mesli, for their lack of cooperation as well as their failure to provide any form of clarification on his case.

Advocacy on behalf of terrorism supporters 
In April 2004, Alkarama issued a report condemning the arrest by Qatari authorities of a number of individuals with ties to terrorism. The Alkarama Foundation report did not mention their activities in support of terrorism but called on Qatar to release the arbitrarily detained individuals. The report listed Ibrahim Issa al-Bakr, Salim Hasan al-Kuwari, Abd al-Latif Bin Abdullah Salih Muhammad al-Kawari, Khalid Saeed al-Bounein and others as the detainees which Alkarama demanded be released.

The U.S. Treasury claimed that in the early 2000s, when Alkarama released its advocacy report, Ibrahim Issa al-Bakr was “working to raise money to support terrorism” and was involved in a jihadist network. In 2014, the U.S. government designated Ibrahim Issa al-Bakr as an al-Qaeda supporter and Specially Designated Global Terrorist who worked with a Lebanon-based network to procure and transport weapons to Syria with the help of an al-Qaeda associate in Syria. In January 2015, al-Bakr was added by the United Nations to the al-Qaeda Sanctions List of individuals subject to an assets freeze and travel ban.

Salim Hasan al-Kuwari is a Qatari national and US-designated financier and facilitator of al-Qaeda. The U.S. Treasury claimed that Kuwari supports al-Qaeda through Iran-based al-Qaeda associates and has provided “hundreds of thousands of dollars in financial support to al-Qaeda. In 2009, Alkarama submitted Kuwari’s case to the UN Working Group on Arbitrary Detention (WGAD).

Abd al-Latif Bin Abdullah Salih Muhammad al-Kawari, a Qatar-based al-Qaeda facilitator who worked alongside Hassan Ghul and Ibrahim Isa Muhammad al-Bakr to transfer money to al-Qaeda in Pakistan. Al-Kawari was also a coordinator of Madid Ahl al-Sham, an online fundraising campaign used to fund al-Nusra Front militants in Syria and transfer weapons and supplies to the terrorist group.
Khalid Saeed al-Bounein was a coordinator for Madid Ahl al-Sham alongside SDGTs Abd al-Latif Bin Abdullah Salih Muhammad al-Kawari and Sa’d bin Sa’d Muhammad Shariyan al-Ka’bi. Al-Bounein is listed as a point of contact for donations to the campaign that was cited by a Nusra Front member as the “preferred conduit” for donations. Al-Bounein was also listed as a point of contact in a partner charity fundraiser led by Eid Charity and Madid Ahl al-Sham.

References

Notes

External links
Alkarama Foundation

Human rights organisations based in Switzerland
Civil rights organizations
International human rights organizations